Gazi University is a public university located primarily in Ankara, Turkey.
It was established in 1926 by Mustafa Kemal Atatürk as Gazi Teacher Training Institute. In 1982, it was reorganized by merging with the Bolu Academy of Engineering and Architecture, Ankara Academy of Economics and Commercial Sciences, the Ankara College of Technical Careers, the Ankara Girls' College of Technical Careers, and the Ankara State Academy of Engineering and Architecture to form a large metropolitan university as part of the act which created the Board of Higher Education. Prior to 1982 when the Board of Higher Education Law came into effect, institutions of higher education in Turkey were organized under different structures as universities, academies, institutes, and schools. In 1992, the faculties and vocational schools in Bolu became Abant Izzet Baysal University.

Gazi University consists of 21 faculties, 4 schools, 11 vocational schools of higher education, 52 research centers and 7 graduate institutes. The student enrollment of Gazi University has reached approximately 77,000 in total of whom about 1,500 come from the Turkic states of Central Asia. Five thousand students are enrolled in graduate programmes. The total size of the teaching faculty exceeds 3,000 persons.

Ranking 
Gazi University was ranked 6th by URAP Turkish University Rankings in 2021. URAP also ranked Gazi in the fourth place in "Engineering" and  "Technology" subjects in Turkey. According to CWUR, Gazi is ranked 844 in 2022 World University Rankings. In QS Rankings Gazi was placed between 801-1000 category in 2021. In QS Rankings 2022, Gazi is ranked 21st in education subject worldwide and ranked 1st in Turkey in the same subject. In RUR 2022 Gazi is ranked 653rd in World University Rankings.

Faculties 

 Faculty of Architecture
 Faculty of Engineering
 Faculty of Fine Arts
 Faculty of Health Sciences
 Faculty of Medicine
 Faculty of Pharmacy
 Faculty of Sciences
 Faculty of Technical Education
 Faculty of Technology
 Gazi Faculty of Education
 Industrial Arts Education Faculty
Some former faculties have been separated from Gazi University. They are now operating under AHBV University.

Graduate schools 
 Graduate School of Educational Sciences
 Graduate School of Fine Arts
 Graduate School of Health Sciences
 Graduate School of Informatics
 Graduate School of Research and Prevention of Accidents
 Graduate School of Sciences
 Graduate School of Social Sciences

Schools
 School of Banking and Insurance
 School of Foreign Languages
 School of Land Registry and Cadastre
 School of Physical Education and Sport

Vocational schools 
 Ankara Vocational School
 Atatürk Vocational School
 Beypazari Technical Sciences Vocational School
 Distance Education/Learning Vocational School
 Gazi Vocational School
 Ostim Vocational School
 Polatlı Vocational School of Social Sciences 
 Vocational School of Health Services 
 Vacational School of Land Registry and Cadastre
 Vocational School of Law
 Vocational School of Public Finance

University governance 
The rector of Gazi University is Musa Yıldız.

Campuses
Gazi University is a city-university which has a multitude of campuses around Ankara, the capital city of Turkey. Its main campus is situated in Beşevler.

The university's campuses are almost directly inside the city, which makes it easier to find houses to live and centers for shopping, for students. There are many activities at these campuses for students, such as the Spring Festival, free concerts, opening concerts, sports tournaments, theatre performances and performances by student clubs as well as scientific and cultural seminars.

Gazi University Central Library 
Gazi University library has 150,000 books, 62,000 bound periodicals, and 10,000 master theses. The library subscribes to 700 periodicals in foreign languages and 600 in Turkish, and provides access to 20,000 on-line journals and 30 on-line databases. Collections are predominantly in Turkish, English and German. Library orientation programs are organized for new Gazi students.

Achievements
Turkey's third face transplant, a partial face transplant, was  performed on March 17, 2012, on Hatice Nergis, a twenty-year-old woman, at the university's hospital by a team led by surgeon Selahattin Özmen. The patient from Kahramanmaraş had lost her upper jaw six years prior, including mouth, lips, palate, teeth and nasal cavity by a firearm accident, and was unable to eat. She had undergone in the past around 35 reconstructative plastic surgery operations. The donor was a 28-year-old woman in Istanbul, who committed suicide.

Notable people

Alumni (including graduates of former colleges)

 Abbas Güçlü - Journalist, writer, TV programmer, educator
 Abdullatif Sener - Associate Professor of Finance, former Parliament deputy, former Deputy Prime Minister, Finance Minister and former founder of Turkey Party
 Adnan Binyazar - Author, critic, educator
 Ahmet Telli - Writer and educator
 Ali Palabıyık - Football referee and teacher
 Aziz Yıldırım - Businessman, civil engineer and former president of Fenerbahçe Sports Club
 Bekir Küçükay, guitar player
 Beşir Göğüş - M.E.B. Chief Inspector, critic
 Biket İlhan - Cinema producer, director, founder of Sinevizyon film company, director
 Bülent Bezdüz - State Opera and Ballet lead soloist, 2 Grammy award-winning musician
 Cemil Demirbakan Musician, former soloist of the Yüksek Sadakat group
 Coşkun Ertepınar - Poet, M.E.B. inspector and counselor
 Çiğdem Batur - Actor, voice actor, presenter
 Devlet Bahçeli - Politician, economist, Milliyetçi Hareket Partisi leader and former deputy prime minister
 Emin Özdemir - Academic, linguist and literary researcher
 Erman Toroğlu - Former football player, football commentator
 Fakir Baykurt - Author, trade unionist
 Fatih Uraz - Manager, former professional football player
 Ferman Akgül - Rock artist, soloist of the MaNga band
 Fikret Bila - Journalist, presenter, former TCA auditor
 Hasan Hüseyin Korkmazgil - Poet and humorous story writer
 İbrahim Melih Gökçek - Former Ankara Mayor, journalist
 İlhan Berk - Poet, translator, writer, teacher
 İnci Aral - Story and novel writer
 İsmail Altınok - Painter, writer, instructor
 İsmail Küçükkaya - Journalist, news presenter, writer
 Kamer Genç -  Deputy of Republican People's Party, former Council of State Investigation Judge and Council of State Prosecutor
 Kemal Kılıçdaroğlu - Bureaucrat, Chairman of the Republican People's Party
 Kemal Unakıtan - Former Minister of Finance
 Kenan Işık - Actor, presenter, main news presenter, former journalist
 Metin Yurdanur - Sculptor
 Mustafa Balel - translator, story and novel writer
 Mustafa Erdoğan - Artistic director, journalist
 M. Rifat Hisarcıklıoğlu - President of the Union of Chambers and Commodity Exchanges of Turkey
 Naim Süleymanoğlu - Professional weightlifter
 Nihat Özdemir - President of the Turkish Football Federation, Limak Holding CEO
 Nurcan Taylan - Olympic Champion weightlifter
 Ömer Çelik - Politicians, journalists, former Minister of Turkey and the European Union, former Culture and Tourism Minister
 Özdemir İnce - Poet, writer, journalist
 Rıfat Ilgaz - Poet, novelist, story writer
 Sina Koloğlu - Keyboardist of Bulutsuzluk Özlemi, critic
 Sinan Şamil Sam - Professional boxer
 Süleyman Saim Tekcan - Painter, film actor, sculptor, printmaker, graphic artist, engraver and academician
 Şeref Eroğlu - Professional wrestler
 Tahsin Saraç - Poet, one of the Teachers' Union of Turkey founder
 Tarık Daşgün - Manager and former national football player
 Tuncay Özkan - (Republican People's Party) Deputy Chairperson, journalist, writer, broadcaster
 Zafer Çağlayan - Former Industry and Trade Minister, former Foreign Trade Minister, former Minister of Economy, former ASO and former TOBB vice president.
 Zekai Tunca - Turkish Classical Music artist

See also
 List of universities in Ankara
 List of universities in Turkey

References

External links 
 
 Gazi Central Library  
 Gazi University Foundation 
 Gazi University Center for Turkish Teaching  
 Gazi University Center for Foreign Language Teaching 
 Gazi University Alumni Organization 
 Radio Gazi Fm 
 Gazi University Faculty of Engineering  
 Gazi University Faculty of Architecture  
 Gazi University Faculty of Economics and Administrative Sciences 

 
Educational institutions established in 1926
Things named after Mustafa Kemal Atatürk
1926 establishments in Turkey